Athens railway station is the main railway station of Athens, and the second largest station in Greece. Located in the central quarter of Kolonos, the railway station resulted from the merger of two separate railway terminals in 2005—Larissa station of the Piraeus–Platy railway towards central and northern Greece, and the Peloponnese station of the Piraeus–Patras railway that formerly linked Athens with the Peloponnese.

The station is still colloquially known as Larissa Station, and is also the name of the adjacent Athens Metro station.

History
Inaugurated in 1904, the station was named after the city of Larissa (then the northernmost city of the Kingdom of Greece) and the one nearest the northern terminus of the standard-gauge Piraeus–Papapouli railway. The adjacent Peloponnese Station, inaugurated on 30 June 1884, was served by the metre-gauge Piraeus–Patras railway to the Peloponnese. In 1920 Hellenic State Railways or SEK was established; however, many railways, such as the SPAP continued to be run as a separate company, becoming an independent company once more two years later.

Due to growing debts, the SPAP came under government control between 1939 and 1940. During the Axis occupation of Greece (1941–44), Athens was controlled by German military forces, and the line was used for the transport of troops and weapons. During the occupation (and especially during the German withdrawal in 1944), the network was severely damaged by both the German army and Greek resistance groups. The track and rolling stock replacement took time following the civil war, with regular service levels resumed around 1948. In 1954 SPAP was nationalized once more. In 1962 the SPAP was amalgamated into SEK. In 1970, OSE became the legal successor to the SEK, taking over responsibilities for most of Greece's rail infrastructure. On 1 January 1971, the station and most of the Greek rail infrastructure were transferred to the Hellenic Railways Organisation S.A., a state-owned corporation. Freight traffic declined sharply when the state-imposed monopoly of OSE for the transport of agricultural products and fertilisers ended in the early 1990s.

In 2003, the Hellenic Railways Organisation (OSE) launched the Athens Suburban Railway (Proastiakos) as a subsidiary responsible for the establishment of a suburban rail network in the Athens metropolitan area for the 2004 Summer Olympics. Peloponnese Station was closed on 7 August 2005, along with the metre-gauge line between Piraeus and Agioi Anargyroi. Its services were transferred to Larissis Station upon the opening of the Suburban Railway line to Corinth on 27 September 2005. In 2005, TrainOSE was created as a brand within OSE to concentrate on rail services and passenger interface. In 2008, all Athens Suburban Railway services were transferred from OSE to TrainOSE.

The final service departed the unmodernized Larissis Station on 4 June 2017 before it was closed for various upgrades, including the installation of a railway electrification system. The upgraded station was reopened on 30 July 2017. The Athens Metro station, inaugurated on 28 January 2000, lies underground and is served by Line 2 between Anthoupoli and Elliniko. In July 2022, the station began being served by Hellenic Train, the rebranded TrainOSE.

Facilities
The station comprises a large, two-floor building in central Athens. Three platforms and four tracks are currently in use. The second phase of upgrades is underway, including the construction of new tracks and platforms, a central underpass connecting all platforms and the metro station, additional pedestrian underpasses and overpasses, building restoration works and an overhaul of road traffic surrounding the station. In the meantime, trains will continue to use the platforms and tracks built during the previous upgrade, located where the goods yard of the old Peloponnese Station once stood.

Services

Current services 

Since 15 May 2022, the following weekday services call at this station:

 InterCity (IC): five trains per day in each direction to Thessaloniki with additional stops;
 Athens Suburban Railway Line 3 towards , with up to one train every two hours, and one extra train during the peak hours.

Former services 

During the twentieth century, especially in the first half, Athens station was the terminus for some international trains, such as an Express to Berlin (departing from the former Anhalter Bahnhof) or the "Arlberg" route of the Orient Express (London-Athens via Paris-Zürich-Vienna-Budapest-Belgrade-Skopje), in service until 1962 and then of the Direct Orient Express (Paris-Lausanne-Venice-Ljubljana-Zagreb-Belgrade-Skopje) until 1976.

Upgrades
The work comprises the construction of lines 1-6, part of the underground crossing providing a connection to all the platforms and the connection to “Larissa” station, of Attiko Metro S.A. as well as the inclusion of provisional sheds and E/M works at ground level. The works will be implemented without rail traffic interruption, with the electrified right half corridor of the Railway Station (Lines 7-10) in operation and the uninterrupted passenger access from the east (Diligianni street) and the west (Konstantinoupoleos street) secured.

Gallery

See also
Railway stations in Greece
Hellenic Railways Organisation
Hellenic Train
New Thessaloniki Railway Station
P.A.Th.E./P.
Athens Suburban Railway
Railways of Greece

References

External links
 Athens railway station - National Railway Network Greek Travel Pages

Athens Metro stations
Railway
Railway
Railway stations opened in 1904
Railway stations in Attica
1904 establishments in Greece